Liting Ke is a Chinese swimmer. She won the gold medal at the Women's 100 metre backstroke S7 event at the 2016 Summer Paralympics with 1:23.06.

References

Living people
Swimmers at the 2016 Summer Paralympics
Medalists at the 2016 Summer Paralympics
Paralympic gold medalists for China
Paralympic swimmers of China
Chinese female freestyle swimmers
Swimmers at the 2012 Summer Paralympics
S7-classified Paralympic swimmers
Chinese female backstroke swimmers
Year of birth missing (living people)
Paralympic medalists in swimming
21st-century Chinese women
Medalists at the 2018 Asian Para Games